Alessandro Michele Cavazza (born 11 September 1992), mostly known as Sandro Cavazza, is a Swedish songwriter and former singer of Italian origin. Besides his solo career he was also a member of the pop group Estraden.

He names his musical influences as Eagle-Eye Cherry, Nirvana, Red Hot Chili Peppers, Westlife, ABBA, Max Martin, Bon Iver and Queen, in particular Freddie Mercury.

Cavazza is well known as a good friend of the Swedish producer Avicii. Together they made two songs ("Gonna Love Ya" and "Sunset Jesus") for Avicii's album Stories. Cavazza also features on "Without You" which was nominated for a Grammis in 2017. During a road-trip through America, Avicii and Cavazza made multiple songs together. After Avicii's death in 2018, only "Forever Yours" was released in 2020, after it was finished by the Norwegian producer Kygo.

Personal life
In an interview in June 2018, Cavazza described his background as "very Swedish and part Italian", consisting of Sunday dinners with his Italian family partnered with a very secure social system in Sweden. This allowed him the opportunity to attend music school. On November 23, 2021, Cavazza announced that he was going to "end his career" as an artist, claiming the reasons to be that "some things like social media, competition and being at the center of attention do not make me happy." He intends to focus on his career as a songwriter and has one final concert planned for Stockholm in 2022.

Discography

Extended plays

Singles

As lead artist

As featured artist

Non-single album appearances

Notes

References 

Living people
1992 births
Musicians from Stockholm
Singers from Stockholm
Swedish male singer-songwriters
Swedish singer-songwriters
Swedish pop singers
Swedish songwriters
English-language singers from Sweden
21st-century Swedish singers
Swedish people of Italian descent
21st-century Swedish male singers